The 2003–04 Kansas Jayhawks men's basketball team represented the University of Kansas in the 2003–04 NCAA Division I men's basketball season, which was the Jayhawks' 106th basketball season and first under head coach Bill Self who was hired after Roy Williams accepted the head coaching position at his alma mater North Carolina. The team played its home games in Allen Fieldhouse in Lawrence, Kansas. KU finished the season with a record of 24–9, 12–4 in Big 12 play to finish in a tie for second place in conference. The Jayhawks lost to Texas in the Big 12 tournament semifinals and received an at-large bid to the NCAA tournament as a No. 4 seed in the St. Louis Region. They advanced to the Elite Eight where they lost to Georgia Tech.

Recruiting class

Roster

Schedule

|-
!colspan=9 style=| Regular season

|-
!colspan=9 style=|Big 12 Tournament

|-
!colspan=9 style=|NCAA tournament

Rankings

References 

Kansas Jayhawks men's basketball seasons
Kansas
Kansas
Jay
Jay